Muhammad Ali Jalandhari (1895 - 21 April 1971) was a prominent Ahrari leader, Islamic scholar. He served as president of Majlis-e-Ahrar-e-Islam Punjab during Khatm-e-Nubuwwat movement in 1953. He was also served Emir and General secretary of Aalmi Majlis Tahaffuz Khatm-e-Nubuwwat.

Early life and education
Jalandhari was born in 1895 in Raipur Araian, Jalandhar, Nakodar, Jalandhar district.

Jalandhari received his early education from Faqir Ullah, a student of Mahmud Hasan Deobandi and then studied with Khair Muhammad Jalandhari in Jalandhar. He studied hadith sciences with Anwar Shah Kashmiri at Darul Uloom Deoband.

Career
Jalandhari co-founded Jamia Khairul Madaris and Aalmi Majlis Tahaffuz Khatm-e-Nubuwwat. He was also one of the foremost leaders of Majlis-e-Ahrar-e-Islam and served as a member of the Central Working Committee of the All India Majlis-e-Ahrar Islam and president of Majlis-e-Ahrar-ul-Islam Punjab chapter.

References

1895 births
1971 deaths
Darul Uloom Deoband alumni
Deobandis
Hanafis
Pakistani Islamic religious leaders
Pakistani Sunni Muslim scholars of Islam
Muslim missionaries
People from Jalandhar district
Emirs of Aalmi Majlis Tahaffuz Khatm-e-Nubuwwat
Aalmi Majlis Tahaffuz Khatm-e-Nubuwwat people
Jamia Khairul Madaris people